Franz Xaverius Senn (19 March 1831 – 31 January 1884) was an Austrian priest and mountaineer who was among the first to promote alpinism and foster the early development of mountaineering in Tyrol. His concern for the poverty of his parishioners led him to encourage tourism into the Stubaital and Ötztal valleys. Senn was a founding member of the Austrian and German alpine associations. The Franz Senn Hütte and the Sennkogel are named in his honour. Senn's passion for mountaineering led to his ascent of numerous 3,000-metre summits throughout the Ötztal Alps.

References
Citations

Bibliography

External links
 Der Gletscherpfarrer 

19th-century Austrian Roman Catholic priests
Austrian mountain climbers
1831 births
1884 deaths